Ōmisaki Station (大三東駅, Ōmisaki-eki) is a train station located in Ariake-chō, Shimabara, Nagasaki. The station is serviced by Shimabara Railway and is a part of the Shimabara Railway Line.

The railway station is believed to be the closest railway station to the seas around Japan.

Lines 
The train station is serving for the Shimabara Railway Line, with local and express trains stop at this station.

Platforms 
Moriyama Station consists of two side platforms with two tracks that serves for the Shimabara Railway Line.

Adjacent stations 

|-
|colspan=5 style="text-align:center;" |Shimabara Railway

See also 
 List of railway stations in Japan

References

External links 
 

Railway stations in Japan opened in 1913
Railway stations in Nagasaki Prefecture
Stations of Shimabara Railway